Matthew Hilton (born 1957) is a British furniture designer of modern furniture and lighting.

Life and career 
Hilton attended Portsmouth College of Art and then Kingston Polytechnic graduating in 1979.  After graduation he was an industrial designer and model maker until 1984. In 1991, he designed the "Balzac Armchair" for SCP Limited, a company started by Sheridan Coakley in 1985 and now based in Shoreditch, London. Between 2000 and 2004 Hilton was Habitat's Head of Furniture design, and his furniture is held in the permanent collections of the Victoria and Albert Museum, London, the Geffrye Museum, London, and the Manchester City Art Gallery. He was elected a Royal Designer for Industry (RDI) in 2005. In 2007 Matthew launched his own brand of furniture and the design studio Matthew Hilton Limited. These furniture designs were eventually licensed to De La Espada, a furniture producer based in Portugal and London specialising in the manufacture of high quality pieces using timber. Matthew Hilton Limited is a small design studio based in London and specialising in the design of furniture and lighting, the team have also designed accessories and carpets and many other domestic products.

In 2013, As well as expanding the work of the studio Hilton designed a watch which was self produced in small numbers.

Awards and accomplishments
In 2004 Matthew Hilton was made a Royal Designer for Industry. RDI is the highest accolade for designers in the UK; only 200 designers can hold the title and non-UK designers may receive the honorary title Hon RDI. Hilton's furniture design work has been called the application of skilled craftsmanship, real materials, and serious integrity. Haute Living magazine described it as incredibly elegant, simple lines and master craftsmanship.

In 2012, Hilton received an honorary doctorate from Kingston University for his contributions to British design.

Examples of Matthew Hilton's works
Balzac Armchair Produced by SCP
Light Table, Produced by De La Espada
Eos Garden Furniture Produced by Case Furniture
Dulwich Extending Dining Table Produced by Case Furniture
Cross Extending Dining Table Produced by Case Furniture

Notes and references
 https://www.scp.co.uk/collections/armchairs-and-ottomans/products/balzac-armchair-and-ottoman?variant=33087094924
 http://delaespada.com/products/341e-light-extending-table/

Specific

Further reading
 McDermott, Catherine (2000) Matthew Hilton: Furniture for our Time Geffryre Museum, Lund Humphries Publishers, London,

External links
 Official website
 
 
 
 
 

English furniture designers
British industrial designers
English industrial designers
1957 births
Living people